The Tinaroo Hydro Power Station in Tinaroo, Queensland is an electricity power station located at the spillway of Lake Tinaroo.  It has been designed to take advantage of water being released for irrigation, and water released when the dam is full.

See also

List of active power stations in Queensland

References

Energy infrastructure completed in 2004
Hydroelectric power stations in Queensland
Buildings and structures in Far North Queensland